"Überlin" is a song by American alternative rock band R.E.M. that was released as the third single from their fifteenth and final studio album Collapse into Now on January 25, 2011. The title is a portmanteau of "über" (German "over", see Uber) and "Berlin".

The song's music video was directed by Sam Taylor-Wood and stars her then-fiancé, actor Aaron Johnson, dancing in an area of Shoreditch.

Formats and track listings
 7-inch single (United Kingdom and United States)
 "Überlin" – 4:15
 "What's the Frequency, Kenneth?" (live in Oslo, Norway) – 3:44

 Digital download (Germany)
 "Überlin" – 4:15
 "Everyday Is Yours to Win" (live in studio) – 3:38

 Digital download (United States)
 "Überlin" – 4:15

Charts

References

External links
 

2011 singles
R.E.M. songs
Song recordings produced by Jacknife Lee
Song recordings produced by Michael Stipe
Song recordings produced by Mike Mills
Song recordings produced by Peter Buck
Songs written by Peter Buck
Songs written by Michael Stipe
Songs written by Mike Mills
Warner Records singles